Kristina Kallas (born 29 January 1976) is an Estonian politician who was the leader of the Eesti 200 party. She is not related to Kaja Kallas, the current Prime Ministers of Estonia.

References

1976 births
21st-century Estonian politicians
21st-century Estonian women politicians
Central European University alumni
Estonia 200 politicians
Leaders of political parties in Estonia
Living people
Members of the Riigikogu, 2023–2027
People from Kiviõli
University of Tartu alumni